Shlomo Iluz (born 13 April 1959) is an Israeli former professional footballer that has played in Hapoel Be'er Sheva.

Honours

Club
 Hapoel Be'er Sheva

 Third place (4): 1982/1983, 1987/1988, 1993/1994, 1994/1995
 State Cup:
 Runners-up (1): 1983/1984
 Toto Cup:
 Winners (2): 1988/1989, 1995/1996
 Runners-up (1): 1985/1986
 Lillian Cup:
 Winners (1): 1988
 Runners-up (2): 1982, 1983

References

1959 births
Living people
Israeli footballers
Hapoel Be'er Sheva F.C. players
Liga Leumit players
Israel international footballers
Footballers from Beersheba
Israeli people of Moroccan-Jewish descent
Association football central defenders